Jorre Verstraeten (born 4 December 1997) is a Belgian judoka. He won one of the bronze medals in the men's 60 kg event at the European Judo Championships in 2020 and 2022. He also won one of the bronze medals in the men's 60 kg event at the 2019 European Games held in Minsk, Belarus.

Career
He won one of the bronze medals in the boys' 55 kg event at the 2014 Summer Youth Olympics held in Nanjing, China. In his bronze medal match he defeated Gavin Mogopa of Botswana. He also competed in the mixed team event.

In 2017, he competed in the men's 60 kg event at the European Judo Championships held in Warsaw, Poland. A few months later, he won one of the bronze medals in the men's 60 kg event at the Judo Grand Prix Cancún held in Cancún, Mexico. In 2018, he was eliminated by Eric Takabatake of Brazil in his second match in the men's 60 kg event at the World Judo Championships held in Baku, Azerbaijan.

He won one of the bronze medals in the men's 60 kg event at the 2020 European Judo Championships held in Prague, Czech Republic.

In 2021, he competed in the men's 60 kg event at the Judo World Masters held in Doha, Qatar. A few months later, he won the gold medal in his event at the Judo Grand Slam Antalya held in Antalya, Turkey.

He represented Belgium at the 2020 Summer Olympics in Tokyo, Japan. He competed in the men's 60 kg event where he was eliminated in his second match by Naohisa Takato of Japan.

He won the gold medal in his event at the 2022 Judo Grand Slam Budapest held in Budapest, Hungary.

Career achievements

Major results
2019
 European Championships –60 kg, Minsk
2020
 European Championships –60 kg, Prague
2021
 2021 Judo Grand Slam Antalya –60 kg
2022
 European Championships –60 kg, Sofia

References

External links
 
 
 
 

Living people
1997 births
Place of birth missing (living people)
Belgian male judoka
Olympic judoka of Belgium
Judoka at the 2014 Summer Youth Olympics
Judoka at the 2019 European Games
European Games medalists in judo
European Games bronze medalists for Belgium
Judoka at the 2020 Summer Olympics
21st-century Belgian people